Joachim Gasquet (31 March 1873 – 6 May 1921) was a French author, poet, and art critic.

Biography

Early life
Joachim Gasquet was born in 1873 in Aix-en-Provence.

Career
He was an author, poet and art critic. He is best known for his writing about the artists of his era, particularly Paul Cézanne, a friend and business partner.

His 1921 book, Cézanne, is a testament to the life of the artist, whose work Gasquet had known since an 1895 exhibition at Aix-en-Provence.

Personal life
He married Marie Gasquet in 1896.

He died in 1921.

Bibliography
Cézanne
Narcisse
Les Printemps
Les Champs de la Foret
Il y a une volupte dans la douleur
Les Bienfaits de la guerre
Les Chants seculaires
Le Bucher secret
L'Arbre et les vents
Tu ne tueras point
Quinze aquarelles de pierre laprade pour les chansons d'arlequin.

References

1873 births
1921 deaths
French biographers
French art critics
French poets
Writers from Aix-en-Provence
French male poets
French male non-fiction writers
Male biographers